Ferguslie was a railway station to the west of Paisley, Renfrewshire, Scotland. It was constructed as a planned extension of railway passenger services in the Paisley area by the Paisley and Barrhead District Railway, which opened in 1897, but none of the stations opened for passengers. The line was only used for freight services and closed in 1960s. The track has been lifted and the station buildings removed.

History
The station was originally part of the Paisley and Barrhead District Railway. The line was opened in 1897 and used for freight until the 1960s but none of the stations including this one opened for passenger travel. It was situated about one hundred yards south of the main A761 Paisley to Elderslie road between the Aldi shop at Fulbar Road and Newton Terrace.

Railway photographers Norris Forrest and GH Robin took pictures in the vicinity of the station.

See also

Notes 
The Norris Forrest photographs are the copyright of the Great North of Scotland Railway Association. The GH Robin photographs are the copyright of the Mitchell Library, Glasgow.

References

External links 

 Dedicated web page

Disused railway stations in Renfrewshire
Unbuilt railway stations in the United Kingdom
Buildings and structures in Paisley, Renfrewshire
Transport in Paisley, Renfrewshire